Xiangtan North railway station is a railway station of Hangchangkun Passenger Railway located in Yuhu District, Xiangtan, Hunan Province, People's Republic of China.

Metro station
It will be served by the South extension of Changsha Metro Line 3 in 2023.

Railway stations in Hunan